Steve Bulen is an American voice actor. He has been doing voices for many animated films and television shows for Walt Disney Animation Studios and Hanna-Barbera as well several video games and anime titles such as Doomed Megalopolis, Giant Robo, Outlaw Star, Street Fighter II V and Rave Master.

He has also worked as looping director on several feature films and wrote several episodes of Bob in a Bottle, Maya the Bee, Jungle Tales, Bumpety Boo, Saban's Adventures of Pinocchio, The Littl' Bits and Samurai Pizza Cats.

He also goes under the names Steve Buelen, Steve Bulin, Stevie Beeline, and Scott Ponsov.

Dubbing roles

Animation dubbing
3x3 Eyes - Steve Long, Hotel Manager
8 Man After - Hazama Itsuro/8 Man
Armageddon - Various
Armitage III - Robot Salesman
Armitage III Polymatrix - Various
Babel II - Koichi/Babel II
Black Magic M-66 - Commando
Carried by the Wind: Tsukikage Ran - Ukiya-tei Housemaster
Casshan: Robot Hunter - Casshan / Tetsuya Azuma
The Castle of Cagliostro - Daisuke Jigen (MGM version)
Code Geass: Lelouch of the Rebellion - Taizou Kirihara
Crimson Wolf - Brukodan's brother; Assassin
Crying Freeman - Yo Hinomura/Crying Freeman/Ron Tayan
The Dirty Pair's Affair on Nolandia - Officer; Dr. Kashida
Doomed Megalopolis - Professor Terada
Dragon Century
Dragon Slayer - Roe
Fight! Iczer-One - Commander
Fist of the North Star movie - Wise Man
Ghost in the Shell - Section 9 Staff Cyberneticist, Coroner
Ghost in the Shell: Stand Alone Complex - Fukami
Giant Robo - Professor Go Gakujin
Honeybee Hutch - Additional Voices
The Legend of Black Heaven - Fomalhaut
Lily C.A.T. - Morgan W. Scott
Lupin III: The Mystery of Mamo - Daisuke Jigen
Lupin III: Tales of the Wolf - Daisuke Jigen
Mobile Suit Gundam: The Movie Trilogy - General Elron, Lt. Seki
Nadia: The Secret of Blue Water (original dub) - Gargoyle
Orguss 02  - Minister Kerachi
Outlanders - Progress (L.A. Hero Dub)
Outlaw Star - Leilong/Shimi
Rave Master - Gale Glory
Space Adventure Cobra - Additional Voices
Space Adventure Cobra: The Movie - Sheriff
Street Fighter II V - Donu
Street Fighter II: The Animated Movie - Investigators
Tekkaman Blade - Balzac
Trigun - Midvalley the Hornfreak
Twilight of the Dark Master - Kudo
The Wings of Honneamise - General Khaidenn
Vampire Hunter D - Greco
Zillion: Burning Night - Gardok Odama

Filmography

Animation
Batman: The Animated Series - Officer
Challenge of the GoBots - Additional Voices
Chucklewood Critters - Franklin
Creepy Crawlers - Bolt Jolt, Squirminator, Skrull, Professor Googengrime
DuckTales - Additional Voices
DuckTales the Movie: Treasure of the Lost Lamp - Additional Voices
Iznogoud - Additional Voices
Jin Jin and the Panda Patrol - Ponurak
The Little Mermaid - Additional Voices
The Little Polar Bear - Additional Voices
Mulan - Shang's Troops
Kung Fu Panda - Anvil Of Heaven 2
Popeye and Son - Additional Voices
Pound Puppies - Mr. Simon, Rocky, Attorney
The Return of Dogtanian - Count Beajeaux
Rockin' with Judy Jetson - Additional Voices
The Super Powers Team: Galactic Guardians - Additional Voices
The Transformers - Sureshot, Searchlight, Onslaught
Tugger: The Jeep 4x4 Who Wanted to Fly - Towerman, Crewman 3
Willy Fog 2 - Rigadon
The Wind in the Willows: The Movie - Mole (American dub)

Live-action
Mrs. Munck - Quigley (voice)
My Name Is Modesty: A Modesty Blaise Adventure - Additional Voices
Pinocchio - First Doctor (voice)
Shaolin Soccer - Fung (voice)
Twin Dragons - Dubbing Voices
The White Shadow - Man at Door

Video games
Battlezone - Various
Codename: Panzers Phase Two - James Barnes
Groove Adventure Rave: Fighting Live - Gale Glory
Medal of Honor: Allied Assault - Additional Voices
Medal of Honor: Frontline - Captain
Might and Magic: World of Xeen - Various
Mission Impossible: Operation Surma - Director Swanbeck, Vasyl Berkut
Quest for Glory V: Dragon Fire - Abdim, Bruno, Cerberus 2, Erasmus/Minos
Rave Master: Special Attack Force - Gale Glory
Rugrats: Search for Reptar - Additional Voices
Star Trek: Judgment Rites - Eadric Kamend, Nielson
Star Trek: 25th Anniversary Enhanced - Eadric Kamend, Nielsen

Staff work
Bob in a Bottle - Writer
Bumpety Boo - Writer
Dawson's Creek - Group ADR Coordinator
Happy, Texas - ADR Voice
Jungle Tales - Writer
The Littl' Bits - Writer
Maya the Bee - Writer
The Pie in the Sky - ADR Loop Group
Profile for Murder - ADR Voice
The Road to El Dorado - ADR Loop Group
RocketMan - ADR Loop Group
Saban's Adventures of Pinocchio - Writer
Samurai Pizza Cats - Writer
Shrek - ADR Loop Group
Turner & Hooch - ADR Voice Group
The Twilight of the Golds - ADR Loop Group
The Zone - Additional Voice

External links

Living people
American male voice actors
American television writers
Year of birth missing (living people)
Place of birth missing (living people)
American male television writers
American male screenwriters
Hanna-Barbera people